Marco Maddaloni (born 7 December 1984 in Naples) is an Italian judoka.

Biography 

Marco Maddaloni, 177 cm tall, under-73 kg Italian judoka, was born in Naples on 7 December 1984 as the third and youngest child of Giovanni Maddaloni and Caterina Iuliano. His father Giovanni ran the local Judo Club Star Napoli, where his elder brother Pino and sister Laura were already vigorously training at the time he was born. In 2002, at age 17, he became absolute champion of Republica Italiana in the under-73 category, an unprecedented record. In the following year Marco became European Junior vice-champion, and in 2004 and 2005 he won back-to-back European under-23 championships. Other than judo, Marco was a carabiniere 2003–2004, and as of 2005 he is a member of the Italian police. In early 2009 he appeared as a photo-model on a cover of a nationwide magazine.

Maddaloni is involved in the cast of the 2019 Italian edition of L'isola dei famosi.

Achievements

Seven times Italian judo champion for age (of which 3 times Italian champion all age);
2002, absolute judo champion of Italy at 17 years of age, the youngest of all times !!!
2003, European junior judo vice-champion, Sarajevo;
2004, European under-23 judo champion, Ljubljana;
2005, European under-23 judo champion, Kiev;
2005, absolute judo champion of Italy;
2008, 5th place in the European Championschips, Lisboa;
2008, 3rd place in the World Cup, Tbilisi;
2008, 3rd place in the World Cup, Vienna

Medals overview

Medals overview G S B
Continental Titles U23: 2 0 0
World Cups: 0 0 2
Continental junior Titles: 0 1 0
National Ch. Titles: 3 1 1
National Ch. Titles U20: 2 0 2

References

External links
 

Italian male judoka
Living people
1984 births
Sportspeople from Naples
European Games competitors for Italy
Judoka at the 2015 European Games